UYI may refer to:
Use Your Illusion - various music and music videos
Uruguay peso en Unidades Indexadas (URUIURUI, funds code), an ISO4217 registered currency